Ebbsfleet may refer to:

 Ebbsfleet Valley, a redevelopment zone of the Thames Gateway in north west Kent, England
Ebbsfleet River
Ebbsfleet International railway station
Ebbsfleet United F.C., formerly Gravesend & Northfleet F.C.
The Ebbsfleet Academy, actually located in nearby Swanscombe
 Ebbsfleet, Thanet, a hamlet in north east Kent, England
Bishop of Ebbsfleet